Ullasa Utsaha is a 2010 Indian Kannada-language romance film directed by Devraj Palan, starring Ganesh and Yami Gautam (in her only Kannada film to date). It also marked the latter's acting debut. Ganesh's wife turned producer with this film. A remake of the 2008 Telugu film Ullasamga Utsahamga, it was released after a four month delay.

Plot 

Preetam, an irresponsible young man, falls for Mahalakshmi and tries to woo her. But Mahalakshmi, who is in love with her childhood friend, eventually asks Preetam to take her to meet her love.

Cast 
 Ganesh as Preetham
 Yami Gautam as Mahalakshmi
 Rangayana Raghu
 Sadhu Kokila
 Sharan
 Doddanna
 Karibasavaiah
 Kavitha
 Tulasi
 Sihi Kahi Chandru
 Vithika Sheru
 Mithra

Production 
Ganesh decided to star in the Kannada remake of Ullasamga Utsahamga after watching the film. This film is produced by Thyagraju, the uncle of Yasho Sagar who played the lead in the original. Bollywood actress Yami Gautam made her debut with this film.

Soundtrack 
The soundtrack was composed by G. V. Prakash Kumar.

Reception 

A critic from The Times of India stated that "While the first half is exhilarating, the second half is an excellent mixture of sentiments, romance and comedy". A critic from Bangalore Mirror said that "What works for the film is the strict adherence to a well worked out storyline and the comedy situations that are worked into it". A critic from Sify said that "For those who have already watched the original is strictly off limits unless you are die-hard fan of Ganesh". Shruti Indira Lakshminarayana of Rediff.com scored the film at 2.5 out of 5 stars and says "All in all, Ullasaha Uthsaha is a time pass, feel good romantic comedy. It is a onetime watch for Ganesh's diehard fans and for those of you who haven't seen the original". Ullasa Utsaha was a box office failure.

References

External links 

Films scored by G. V. Prakash Kumar
Indian romance films
Kannada remakes of Telugu films
2010 romance films